Rodeo is a census-designated place (CDP) in Hidalgo County, New Mexico, United States, at . As of the 2010 census, the population of Rodeo was 101.

History
Founded in 1902 as a rail stop on the El Paso and Southwestern Railroad line running from Bisbee, Arizona to El Paso, Texas, it became the center for cattle shipping in the San Simon Valley. Two views exist as to the source of Rodeo's name. One suggests it derives from the Spanish word rodeo, meaning "roundup" or "enclosure", in reference to cattle shipping. However, the noun rodeo is derived from the Spanish verb rodear meaning "to surround" or "to go around". The El Paso and Southwestern railroad runs east across the southern part of the state and after passing through Antelope Pass turns south to Rodeo continuing to Douglas, Arizona, and then north to Bisbee, going around the Chiricahua Mountains.

Geography
Rodeo is in western Hidalgo County, bordering the state of Arizona. New Mexico Highway 80 leads north  to Interstate 10 at Road Forks and southwest  to the state line, continuing as Arizona State Route 80 southwest another  to Douglas, Arizona.

Demographics

See also

 List of census-designated places in New Mexico

References

Further reading

External links

 Hidalgo County official website

Unincorporated communities in New Mexico
Unincorporated communities in Hidalgo County, New Mexico